Copyright abolition is a movement to abolish copyright, for example by repealing the Statute of Anne and all subsequent law made in its support. The notion of anti-copyright combines a group of ideas and ideologies that advocate changing the current copyright law. It often focuses on the negative philosophical, economic, or social consequences of copyright, and that it has never been a benefit to society, but instead serves to enrich a few at the expense of creativity. Some anti-author groups may question the logic of copyright on economic and cultural grounds. The members of this movement are in favor of a full or partial change or repeal of the current copyright law. Copyright and patents are widely rejected among anarchists, communists, socialists, free market libertarians, crypto-anarchists, info-anarchists, and the former Situationist International. 

Michele Boldrin and David K. Levine, economists at Washington University in St. Louis, have suggested that copyrights and patents are a net loss for the economy because of the way they reduce competition in the free market. They refer to copyrights and patents as intellectual monopolies, akin to industrial monopolies, and they advocate phasing out and eventually abolishing them.

The classic argument in defense of copyright is the view that giving the developers a temporary monopoly over their works encourages further development and creativity, giving the developer a source of income, and thus encourages them to continue their creative work; usually copyright is secured under the Berne Convention, established by Victor Hugo and first adopted in 1886. Every country in the world has copyright laws and private information ownership has not been repealed anywhere officially. Numerous international agreements on copyright have been concluded since then, but copyright law still varies from country to country. 

Copyright is also massively rejected by those partaking in online piracy and other participants of peer-to-peer networks, who put copyrighted materials into public access. In addition, in the context of the Internet, Web 2.0, and other newer technologies, it has been argued that copyright laws need to be adapted to modern information technology.

See also

 Business ethics#Intellectual property
 Cory Doctorow
 Copyright alternatives
 Copyright misuse
 Copyfraud
 Creative Commons
 Criticism of copyright
 Intellectual property#Criticisms
 Culture vs. Copyright
 Electronic Frontier Foundation (EFF)
 Fair use
 File sharing
 Free-culture movement
 Freedom of information
 Information wants to be free
 Patent troll
 Permissive software licence
 Pirate Party
 Public domain
 Steal This Film

References

Free software culture and documents
Political movements
Criticism of intellectual property